The wazza, also referred to as al-Wazza, is a type of natural horn played in Sudanese music. The wazza is a long wind instrument, constructed by joining several wooden tubes to form an elaborate gourd trumpet, and while blown, it is also tapped for percussive effect. Characteristically, it has been used by the Berta people of the Blue Nile State in Sudan.

Before it can be played, the instrument must be made wet with water, so it produces its intended sound. Several wazza trumpets of different sizes and tone ranges are used simultaneously by several players, performing their sounds in African polyrhythmic patterns.

See also 

 Music of Sudan

References

External links 

 Waza trumpet returns as residents in Sudan's Blue Nile region mark end of harvest, video on YouTube
Free download from Smithsonian Folkways Records of the song “Ya Musa. Waza-Ensemble”

Arabic musical instruments
Natural horns and trumpets
Sudanese musical instruments
African musical instruments